Əyricə is a village and municipality in the Barda District of Azerbaijan. It has a population of 722.

See also 
2020 Barda missile attacks

References 

Populated places in Barda District